was a Japanese futsal club, played in the F. League. The team was located in Sendai, Miyagi Prefecture, Japan. Their main arena was Sendai Gymnasium.

Chronicle

Trophies

References

External links 
  

Sports teams in Sendai
Futsal clubs in Japan
Futsal clubs established in 2012
2012 establishments in Japan